The Supermarine Commercial Amphibian (originally named the Supermarine Amphibian, later designated N147 by the British Air Ministry) was a passenger-carrying flying boat. The first aircraft to be designed by Supermarine's Reginald Mitchell, it was built at the company's works at Woolston, Southampton, for an Air Ministry competition that took place during September 1920. Based on the Supermarine Channel, the Amphibian was a biplane flying boat with a single engine, a wooden hull, unequal wingspans and a  Rolls-Royce Eagle engine. The pilot sat in an open cockpit behind two passengers.

In October 1920 it crashed and was damaged beyond repair, and no more Commercial Amphibians were built, but on the strength of the performance of the aircraft during the competition, Supermarine was commissioned to make a prototype three-seater Fleet Spotter Amphibian, later named the Supermarine Seal II.

Background
In April 1920, the British Air Ministry announced that it would hold two competitions for commercial aircraft, one for land planes and one for seaplanes. The Ministry's aim  was to attempt to stimulate Britain's aircraft industry, which had struggled since the end of World War I. The Supermarine Commercial Amphibian—originally known as the Supermarine Amphibian—was designed by Supermarine's chief designer Reginald Mitchell to compete for the seaplane prize, and was his first aircraft design. The Air Ministry's requirements for the entrants included the need to accommodate at least two passengers that could board the aircraft on land or on the water. Both the passengers and the crew had to have access to lifebelts.

Design

Mitchell based his design for the Amphibian on Supermarine's Channel flying boat, itself a modified version of the AD Flying Boat. A reconnaissance and patrol aeroplane that was produced at the end of World War I, the AD Flying Boat never saw action during the war. 

The Amphibian was a single-engined biplane flying boat with a wooden hull and unequal wingspans. The  Rolls-Royce Eagle engine was mounted between the wings in a pusher configuration (with the propeller mounted behind the engine). The tail had a single vertical fin, and single tailplane mounted halfway up the fin. The front of the aircraft was designed to make sure that it lifted clear of the water prior to take-off, and the nose profile was similar to that of a boat. An innovation introduced by Mitchell was a mechanism to operate the ailerons simultaneously. The undercarriage was designed to be partially retractable.

The Amphibian's pilot was accommodated in an open cockpit just forward of the wings, with space for two passengers in an enclosed cabin further forward. There was a tiller for the pilot to use when the aircraft was on the water, so that it could more easily be navigated through narrow waters.

Operational history

The Air Ministry competition was held during September 1920 at the experimental Royal Air Force stations at Martlesham Heath and Felixstowe. The Supermarine Amphibian (given the registration G-EAVE) was piloted by Herbert Hoare. it competed against two other seaplanes, a Vickers Viking, and a Fairey III. Two other seaplanes failed to arrive for the competition. 

Because of its larger weight and slower speed in comparison with its two competitors, the Supermarine Amphibian performed poorly in the air, but it was judged to be the competition's best constructed and most reliable aircraft. It was the only entrant to complete all the tests, and throughout the competition there was never any need to adjust the aircraft.

The Commercial Amphibian crashed a month after the competition, when on 13 October 1920, after departing from Southampton, it was involved in an accident at Great Bookham, Surrey. It was damaged beyond repair, and no other Amphibians were produced.

Legacy
After the competition, the Air Ministry designated the Vickers Viking as N146, and the Supermarine Amphibian as N147. On the strength of the Amphibian's performance, the Air Ministry commissioned Supermarine to make a prototype three-seater Fleet Spotter Amphibian. The ministry produced specification 7/20 for the prototype, named the Supermarine Seal II, and drawings were completed by Supermarine in November 1920. Features seen in the Amphibian were later used to develop the Supermarine Walrus, hundreds of which were built and were in operational service throughout the World War II. Mitchell also used ideas both from the Amphibian and the Supermarine Channel II to design an Amphibian Flying Boat for Ship Work in 1920.

Specifications

See also

References

Sources

Further reading

 
 

1920s British civil utility aircraft
Amphibious aircraft
Single-engined pusher aircraft
Commercial
Aircraft first flown in 1920